Jack Peter Miller (born 18 January 1995) is an Australian Grand Prix motorcycle racer who rides for the Red Bull KTM Factory Racing in MotoGP. He was the German 2011 IDM 125cc International Champion. Miller has won four races in the premier class, his first at the 2016 Dutch TT on a Marc VDS Honda, his second and third in consecutive weekends of May 2021, at Jerez, Spain, and Le Mans, France on a Ducati, Motegi Japan in 2022 and has finished as the championship runner-up in the 2014 Moto3 World Championship.

Miller now uses the nickname 'Thriller', whereas earlier in his career he was known as 'Jackass'.

Career

Early career
Born in Townsville, Queensland, Australia, Miller grew up on a property outside the city. A tropical city where he made his own fun, riding his motorbike and quad bike, water skiing and lending a hand with fencing and cattle mustering. His parents and siblings have supported his racing career every step of the way, helping him reach his goal of racing in the World Championship. Miller has been racing motorbikes since he was eight years old, originally starting on dirt bikes, where he was the Australian Dirt Bike champion in the 65cc category in 2003. He went on to win five other Australian championships in 2005, 2006 and 2007 and numerous other local and state titles in dirt bike racing and motocross events.

2011 was his breakout year in Europe. A string of strong performances saw him win the championship in the German IDM 125cc category at the age of 16. This title won the attention of Caretta Technology's Forward Racing, an Italian race team who signed Miller to ride in the 2012 Moto3 Championship.

Moto3 World Championship

Carretta Technology Forward Racing (2012)
2012 was Miller's first year in the Moto3 World Championship, riding for Caretta Technology Forward Racing on a Honda chassis. While the bike was not competitive, it allowed Miller the opportunity to learn the circuits he would be racing in the coming years. He finished 23rd in the Moto3 Championship that year with 17 points, and a best finish of 4th at the German Grand Prix, at the Sachsenring.

Racing Team Germany (2013)
Miller moved to Racing Team Germany for the 2013 season, riding an FTR Honda chassis. Miller achieved 13 points-scoring finishes during the season, and finished in seventh place in the final championship standings. His best results were two 5th places, at the San Marino race, and his home Australian Grands Prix.

Red Bull KTM Ajo (2014)
Miller moved to a factory-backed KTM motorcycle for the 2014 season, joining the Red Bull KTM Ajo team. He had a breakout season, recording his first fastest lap, pole position, podium finish and victory in the category. In total, he won six races during the season (Qatar, USA, France, Germany, Australia, and Valencia), and finished the season as runner-up to Álex Márquez in the championship, missing out on the title by just two points.

MotoGP World Championship

CMW LCR Honda (2015) 
For the 2015 season, Miller graduated into the MotoGP class, forming a part of an expanded two-rider Team LCR outfit, partnering Cal Crutchlow, and riding on an open specification Honda RC213V-RS. He achieved his best finish with 11th at Catalunya, following the British Grand Prix, where Miller moved up the order in the early stages, but collided with teammate Crutchlow on the third lap. Miller finished his rookie season in 19th place, with 17 points.

EG 0,0 Marc VDS (2016–2017)

2016 
For the 2016 MotoGP World Championship, Miller moved to the Marc VDS Racing Team. Miller finished in 14th place at Qatar, and at Catalunya, he finished the race in a career best 10th place. On 26 June at Assen, Miller was running strongly in the top 10, before the race was red flagged due to heavy rain. The race restarted for a 12 lap shootout, and Miller clung on to the leaders in the early laps. He was running in 4th by the end of lap 1, and inherited 3rd when Andrea Dovizioso crashed, right behind factory Honda rider Marc Márquez. On lap 3 race leader Valentino Rossi crashed out, and a lap later Miller overtook Màrquez for the race lead. He held his nerve for the rest of the race and pulled away to claim his first premier class victory. He was the first Australian to win a MotoGP race since Casey Stoner in Australia 2012, and the first satellite rider to win a race since Toni Elias in Portugal in 2006. Miller's odds of winning going into the race were said to be 750–1, making it the biggest winning upset in MotoGP history. The rest of his season had mixed fortunes, with occasional speed being blighted by injuries, including a fractured vertebrae in Austria. He claimed three more top 10 finishes to end the year 18th in the standings, with 57 points.

2017 
He returned to the team for 2017, and although sometimes seemed to lack the raw pace from the previous season, he matured and became a more consistent points scorer. This fact was recognised by Honda, who gave him a chance to ride their factory bike at the Suzuka 8 Hours. He recorded nine top-10 finishes during the season, with a best finish of sixth coming twice at Assen, and in the wet at Misano. Despite breaking his leg whilst training before Japan, he returned for his home race in Australia and led the early laps. He finished the year 11th in the standings, with 82 points.

Pramac Racing (2018–2020)

2018 

In 2018 Miller moved to Pramac Racing, now riding a Ducati, siding Danilo Petrucci. However, unlike the Italian, he had to stick with a 2017-spec bike. Nevertheless, the Australian scored two fourth places in Argentina and France, and a pole position in Argentina too, finishing the season in 13th position, with 91 points.

2019 
In 2019 Miller was riding a spec-19 Ducati, after Petrucci moved to the Ducati factory team. His teammate was 2018 Moto2 champion Francesco Bagnaia. The season started strongly for Miller, as in Qatar he qualified 4th, but was forced to retire in the race due to a broken seat while battling for the lead. Miller scored five podiums in Austin (his first podium since his 2016 Assen win), Brno, Aragon, Phillip Island and Valencia, all 3rd places. He finished the season in 8th overall, with 165 points.

2020 
For 2020, in his final season with Pramac Racing Ducati, Miller finished in the top ten in all races he finished, with a best finish of second at Styrian GP, Valencia and Portimao. However Miller incurred several DNFs during the season, including at Andulucia due to error in the intense July heat at Jerez; a DNF in Misano 2 due to a tear-off visor from Fabio Quartararo being sucked into Miller's air intake, causing a reduction in power; a suspected engine failure also occurred while fighting in the lead group at Le Mans; and the opening corners of Aragon 2, where Brad Binder collided with Miller, ending both of their races. Miller closed off the 2020 season strongly with two 2nd places, battling Franco Morbidelli spectacularly on the final lap in both Valencia and Portimao, and finished the season 7th in the championship, with 132 points.

Ducati Lenovo Team (2021–2022)

2021 
During testing in Qatar, Miller, now aboard the factory Ducati team, set unofficial record lap times, but struggled in the races, finishing just 9th in both races held in Doha. During the second Qatar race Miller became frustrated and engaged in a tit for tat struggle with defending world champion Joan Mir: the sequence started when Mir made an aggressive overtake on Miller, causing Mir to briefly lose grip, needing to pick his bike up, and nearly running Miller off the track. Miller then retaliated by colliding with Mir heading down the back straight of the Losail International Circuit. Later in the race Miller provoked another near-accident that could have taken out both Mir and factory Yamaha rider Maverick Viñales, but Miller refused to apologize for the incidents, saying it was Mir who was at fault for any on-track encounters. Miller underwent successful surgery in Spain for compartment syndrome, and would be back to race in Portugal. At the Portuguese Grand Prix he showed good pace all weekend, but crashed out early in the race. At the following races in Jerez, where he qualified 3rd on the grid, Miller got a strong start of the line into first but was passed by Fabio Quartararo early on in the race. Miller took back the lead with seven laps left, after Quartararo himself suffered an arm-pump compartment syndrome, building up a one second gap to his teammate Bagnaia to secure his first win of 2021. For Miller this would be his second MotoGP win after a five-year gap, his first on a Ducati, and his first win in dry conditions. It was also Ducati's first win of 2021 and their first victory at Jerez since 2006. Miller followed up his win in Jerez with a flag to flag win at Le Mans the following weekend, which was notable because he overcame two long lap penalties to secure a dominant victory. He would finish 3rd in Barcelona, before a mid-season bad run saw him drop out of championship contention. He ended the season well with two third places in Portimao and Valencia, overall closing his season with two wins, five podiums, 181 points, and 4th in the rider's championship.

2022 
Miller finished in fifth place on the final standings at this season.

Red Bull KTM Factory Racing (from 2023) 
On 9 June 2022, Miller signed a contract with Red Bull KTM Factory Racing for 2023 and 2024, teaming up with Brad Binder.

Australian Superbike Championship

2021
Jack Miller closed his 2021 journey with a podium in the final Australian Superbike (ASBK) race. After closing the MotoGP season with a podium at the Valencia GP, Miller, riding the Ducati Panigale V4R, started from second place in his debut appearance at The Bend Motorsport Park Circuit.
In the first race Miller experienced DNF when he was in second place behind fellow Ducati rider who later won ASBK 2021 Wayne Maxwell, but in race two he managed to finish and secure third place on the podium.

2022
Jack Miller's will have a 'last dance' with Ducati on Australian Superbikes. In this race, Miller still uses a Ducati motorcycle. Even though he is now part of KTM and has already conducted tests with the RC-16. However, the Panigale V4R remains Miller's mainstay at ASBK.

Personal life
In early October 2022, Miller travelled from the far-Eastern World Championship motorcycle racing venues to be married in Australia. On 15 October 2022, turn four at the Phillip Island racing circuit was renamed from Honda Corner to Miller Corner.

Just a day later, Miller was taken out of the Australian Grand Prix by satellite Honda rider Álex Márquez, who crashed into Miller from behind at Miller Corner.

Nicknames
In his early grands prix career in Moto3, Miller was described as 'Jackass', when he also was an exponent of 'goon riding'. In the later stages of his race career, having risen to the MotoGP class, his nickname changed to 'Thriller'.

Career statistics

Grand Prix motorcycle racing

By season

By class

Races by year
(key) (Races in bold indicate pole position; races in italics indicate fastest lap)

Australian Superbike Championship

Races by year
(key) (Races in bold indicate pole position; races in italics indicate fastest lap)

References

External links
 

1995 births
Living people
Australian motorcycle racers
125cc World Championship riders
Moto3 World Championship riders
LCR Team MotoGP riders
Marc VDS Racing Team MotoGP riders
Pramac Racing MotoGP riders
MotoGP World Championship riders
Ducati Corse MotoGP riders